A. Mark Ratner (born November 1948 in New Jersey, United States) is an American game designer, notable for his work on Space Marines and Space Opera.

Early life
Ratner lived in New Jersey until he joined the Army in 1972. Dissatisfaction with existing games, such as Star Guard and Traveller, and his military experience led to the creation of Space Marines.

FanTac
In 1977 Mark formed FanTac Games primarily to market Space Marines. FanTac published 3 titles; Space Marines (a science-fiction wargame), Gi'ac My (a Vietnam wargame), and Orbit War (an interplanetary combat wargame). Mark was the author of Space Marines and he collaborated with Fitzhugh MacCrae and Bruce Lutz on Gi'ac My.

He met Scott Bizar, the founder of Fantasy Games Unlimited, at Gen Con in 1977, and that meeting eventually led to the sale of the rights for Space Marines to FGU.

Fantasy Games Unlimited
After selling rights to FGU, Mark wrote a second edition of Space Marines.

Scott Bizar wanted to produce a science-fiction role-playing game, and asked Edward E. Simbalist, Phil McGregor, and Ratner to develop it. Prior to publication the three had never met and the development was done by correspondence. However the collaboration with Mark turned out to be mostly Ed drawing on the material in Space Marines. While Mark was listed as an author for Space Opera and the Space Opera supplement "Ground & Air Equipment", he had very little input into the final product and seriously considered asking for his name to be removed from Space Opera entirely.

Academia
Ratner spent much of the 1980s as a college professor. His degrees include Bachelor of Engineering, Master of Engineering in Mechanical Engineering, Master of Science in Civil Engineering, and a PhD in Civil/Structural Engineering.

Books written or co-authored
 Space Marines (1977), FanTac Games
 Gi'ac My (1978), FanTac Games  
 Space Marines, 2nd edition (1979), Fantasy Games Unlimited
 Space Opera (1980), Fantasy Games Unlimited
 Ground & Air Equipment (Space Opera) (1981), Fantasy Games Unlimited
 Star Sector Atlas 6 The Invincible Realm of Hissss'tah (Space Opera) (2018), Fantasy Games Unlimited

References

1948 births
Living people
People from New Jersey
Role-playing game designers